Terms like secret dating, private dating or secret romance refer to the concept of dating or romance between people who wish keep it private from others they might otherwise normally inform. It often overlaps with concepts like forbidden love (such as in affairs or disputes between families). It is presented in titles such as Secret Love.

Reasons for secret dating

Sexual orientation (LGBT)
Homosexuality and LGBT identity is a taboo in some regions of the world, including in most of Africa and Asia. It is therefore, not difficult to see people involved in secret dating with same sex partners in those regions of the world. An historian, Daniel Rivers threw light on how gay parents were in constant fear in the early '70s and '80s of losing their children, in his book, Radical Relations: Lesbian Mothers, Gay Fathers, and Their Children in the United States since World War II.

Older women looking for young men
One of the factors that make people resort to secret dating is their age. Some women prefer to date younger men in their twenties. Because this is not a norm in their society, they may experiment with distance relationships.

Disadvantages of secret dating
A major disadvantage of secret dating is the risk of being scammed. Given that the relationship is private, the people involved will keep details of the relationship to themselves. If the other party is fraudulent, it may take some time detect. If it is open, women tend to share details of their relationship with others. Majority of private dating take place on the internet. With the advent of the online solutions like Tinder and Badoo, scamming and manipulations between the parties have increased. The disadvantages of this type of dating now include stalking and constant need of personal possession

Examples

Cheating
John Tucker Must Die
Pretty Little Liars: Ian Thomas with Alison DiLaurentis behind Melissa Hastings back, and Hanna Marin secretly dating Caleb Rivers
Rebelde Way: Victoria Paz secretly dates Tomás Ezcurra behind Pablo Bustamante's back

Family disapproval
Daddy's Little Girl (novel)
Late Marriage
Night and Day (TV series): Alex Wells was secretly dating his daughter Della Wells' best friend Jane Harper
Romeo and Juliet

Other
Cougar Town: Julia "Jules" Kiki Cobb-Ellis and Grayson Ellis keep their friends with benefits relationship secret
Degrassi: The Next Generation: Peter Michael Stone secretly dates Emma Nelson and Darcy Edwards
Flawless (book): Melissa finds out Spencer has been secretly dating her ex-boyfriend, Wren
Friends: Monica Geller and Chandler Bing keep their relationship secret at first, but are eventually discovered by Phoebe Buffay and Rachel Green
The Office (American TV series): Erin Hannon and Pete Miller start dating but keep their relationship secret from Andy Bernard, but Erin had already broken up with Andy
Scandal (TV series): Liza Weil secretly dates Billy Chambers
Zoey 101: Logan Reese and Quinn Pensky hid their relationship, because they did not want to hinder their high school reputation (Logan Reese being a mean jock who cannot commit, and Quinn Pensky being an awkward geek), but they later announced their relationship at prom.

See also
Dating
Flirting
Secret admirer

References

Interpersonal relationships
Love